Roger David Blandford, FRS, FRAS (born 1949) is a British theoretical astrophysicist, best known for his work on black holes.

Early life
Blandford was born in Grantham, England and grew up in Birmingham.

Career
Blandford is famous in the astrophysical community for the Blandford-Znajek process which is a mechanism for powering relativistic jets by the extraction of rotational energy from a black hole. The Blandford-Znajek mechanism has been invoked by the Event Horizon Telescope Collaboration to explain the jet power in the first observation of a black hole shadow in the giant elliptical galaxy M87. Blandford also theorized another mechanism for jet formation through hydromagnetic winds launched from accretion disks. In addition to the Blandford-Znajek and Blandford-Payne mechanisms for the formation of relativistic jets, Roger Blandford also helped devise a widely used theoretical model for jet geometric and spectral properties, the Blandford-Königl conical jet model, used to predict radio shifts and low-frequency spectral slopes for optically thick jet cores. He has also made significant contributions to other astrophysical phenomena such as supernovae, by extending the Sedov-Taylor blast wave solution to the ultra-relativistic limit of the Blandford-McKee solution.

In April 2005 he wrote a letter to the astronomy community showing his concern about the George W. Bush administration US space science policy.

He is also the chair of Astro2010, the decadal survey that helps define and recommend funding priorities for U.S. astronomy research in the upcoming decade. The Astro2010 report was released August 13, 2010.

Positions 
Blandford is a Fellow of the Royal Society, Member of the U.S. National Academy of Sciences, Fellow of the Royal Astronomical Society and Fellow of the American Academy of Arts and Sciences.  He is currently Luke Blossom Professor in the School of Humanities and Sciences at Stanford University, Professor of Physics at Stanford University and at Stanford Linear Accelerator Center (SLAC) National Accelerator Laboratory.  He was the Pehong and Adele Chen Director, Kavli Institute for Particle Astrophysics and Cosmology from 2003 to 2013. He was a co-editor of the Annual Review of Astronomy and Astrophysics (2005–2011).

Awards
 2020 – Elected a Legacy Fellow of the American Astronomical Society
 2020 – Shaw Prize in Astronomy
 2016 – Crafoord Prize
 2013 – Gold Medal of the Royal Astronomical Society
 2011 – Humboldt Prize
 1999 – Eddington Medal
 1998 – Dannie Heineman Prize for Astrophysics
 1982 – Helen B. Warner Prize for Astronomy

References

External links
 Oral history interview transcript with Roger Blandford on 29 April 2021, American Institute of Physics, Niels Bohr Library and Archives
 Faculty webpage of Roger Blandford at Stanford University
 Prof Roger Blandford, FRS at Debrett's People of Today
 , Part of the Silicon Valley Astronomy Lecture Series

1949 births
Living people
People from Grantham
Alumni of Magdalene College, Cambridge
20th-century British astronomers
Fellows of the Royal Society
Fellows of the American Academy of Arts and Sciences
Fellows of the American Astronomical Society
Institute for Advanced Study visiting scholars
Members of the United States National Academy of Sciences
Recipients of the Gold Medal of the Royal Astronomical Society
Winners of the Dannie Heineman Prize for Astrophysics
21st-century British astronomers
Annual Reviews (publisher) editors
Fellows of the American Physical Society